The 2022–23 season is Bengaluru FC's tenth season as a club since its establishment in 2013. After spending two seasons in Goa, at a centralised venue due to COVID-19 pandemic, the club will return to Sree Kanteerava Stadium, despite the concerns raised by the athletes. This season also marks as the final season leading to the decennial anniversary of the club on 20 July 2023.

Bengaluru's season commenced with the 2022 edition of Durand Cup, which also acts as a curtain raiser for the domestic season. The 2022–23 season of Indian Super League will see the blues returning to the Sree Kanteerava Stadium after three years despite the concerns raised by the athletes. With the Super Cup returning after three years, the inaugural edition's champions will also participate in the tournament which is set to be held in 2023 after the league ends.

Background

In the previous season, the rebuilt Bengaluru FC squad led by Marco Pezzaiuoli finished sixth in the Indian Super League, it was the club's second worst finish in the league after ending up in the seventh spot in 2020-21 season. Before the league, Bengaluru FC made their fifth appearance in the 2021 season of AFC Cup where they failed to make it past the group stage after finishing third behind ATK Mohun Bagan and Bashundhara Kings with four points. Later, in the 2021 edition of Durand Cup, Bengaluru fielded their reserve squad with the assistant head coach Naushad Moosa leading the young team. The team's unbeaten run of four games was halted by FC Goa in the second semifinal, where they went down by a 7-6 margin on penalties.

After failing to qualify for the playoffs in two consecutive seasons, Bengaluru began to make changes in the squad with the likes of defenders Pratik Chaudhari and Sarthak Golui parting ways with the club along with the foreigners Iman Basafa, Cleiton Silva and the head coach Marco Pezzaiuoli who was on the performance-based contract. On 8 June, Bengaluru appointed former Fleetwood Town coach, Simon Grayson as their new head coach on a two-year contract.

Following the head coach's appointment, Bengaluru then handed over contract extensions for Roshan Singh, Lara Sharma and Wungngayam Muirang on two-years each and a three-year deal respectively. Later, on 20 June, Ashique Kuruniyan who had served the club for three seasons moved to ATK Mohun Bagan while Prabir Das from the same club was announced as a new right wingback addition. Two days later, the club strengthened their midfield by signing Spanish international Javi Hernández on a two-year deal. The management further extended the contracts of Parag Shrivas, Leon Augustine and Namgyal Bhutia.

Come July and Bengaluru would make a double deal with the likes of the 22-year-olds from I-League sides, Amrit Gope the former TRAU goalkeeper signed a two-year deal, and Faisal Ali the former Mohamemedan winger penned a deal that ends in 2025. A tragedy shook the Indian football fraternity on 4 July after Adrian Luna, the Kerala Blasters player, disclosed the passing of his six-year-old daughter to whom many players and clubs including Bengaluru FC paid condolences to. On 5 July, Bengaluru filled the void created by the departure of left-back Ajith Kumar by signing Hira Mondal from East Bengal. On 15 July, Yrondu Musavu-King, the Gabonese center-back parted ways with the club after serving for one season. Three days later, Bengaluru made their biggest signing of the season after they closed the deal with the Fijian star striker Roy Krishna who had previously won the Indian Super League Golden Ball in 2020–21 season

20 July 2022 marked the ninth anniversary of Bengaluru FC's foundation. The CEO of the club, Mandar Tamhane, tweeted in celebration of the foundation day, along with the former Bengaluru FC players Darren Caldeira, Cameron Watson and the reserve team head coach Naushad Moosa. On 22 July, Bengaluru completed their Asian slot by signing the six-foot five-inch tall center-back Aleksander Jovanovic from Australia. A day later, the club made four new domestic signings by bringing in the two local talents Sudheer Kotikela and Ankith Padmanabhan from the Karnataka state team along with the two young Goan players, Felixson Fernandes and Clarence Fernandes. They had been scouted from the JSW Youth Cup held a few months earlier in April.

Transfers in

Transfers out

Loans out

Contract extensions

Players
Bengaluru FC has 38 players under contract; the following list of players is subject to change during the transfer season. The final squad for the ISL will be officially announced by the club later.

Players under contract

{| class="wikitable sortable" style="text-align:center; font-size:90%; width:80%;"
|-
! style="text-align:center;"|No.
! style="text-align:center;"|Name
! style="text-align:center;"|Nationality
! style="text-align:center;"|Position
! style="text-align:center;"|Date of Birth (Age)
! style="text-align:center;"|Since
! style="text-align:center;"|Until
! style="text-align:center;"|Picked for Durand Cup
! style="text-align:center;"|Picked for ISL
|-
! colspan="9" style="background:#2545A0; color:#FFFFFF; ; text-align:center;"|Goalkeepers
|-
|1
|Gurpreet Singh Sandhu
|
|GK
|
|2017
|2023
|
|
|-
|30
|Lara Sharma
|
|GK
|
|2020
|2026
|
|
|-
|43
|Sharon Padattil
|
|GK
|
|2020
|2023
|
|
|-
|50
|Amrit Gope
|
|GK
|
|2022
|2024
|
|
|-
! colspan="9" style="background:#2545A0; color:#FFFFFF; ; text-align:center;"|Defenders
|-
|2
|Aleksandar Jovanović
| 
|CB
|
|2022
|2023
|
|
|-
|3
|Sandesh Jhingan
|
|CB
|
|2022
|2023
|
|
|-
|5
|Alan Costa
|
|CB
|
|2021
|2023
|
|
|-
|15
|Wungngayam Muirang
|
|CB/LB
|
|2020
|2025
|
|
|-
|20
|Hira Mondal
|
|LB
|
|2022
|2024
|
|
|-
|27
|Parag Shrivas
|
|CB
|
|2019
|2025
|
|
|-
|32
|Roshan Singh
|
|LB
|
|2020
|2026
|
|
|-
|33
|Prabir Das
|
|RB
|
|2022
|2025
|
|
|-
|—
|Clarence Fernandes
|
|DF
|
|2022
|2025
|
|
|-
|—
|Felixson Fernandes
|
|CB
|
|2022
|2025
|
|
|-
! colspan="9" style="background:#2545A0; color:#FFFFFF; ; text-align:center;"|Midfielders
|-
|4
|Ajay Chhetri †
|
|CDM
|
|2018
|2022
|
|
|-
|6
|Bruno Ramires
|
|CM
|
|2021
|2023
|
|
|-
|7
|Jayesh Rane
|
|CDM
|
|2021
|2024
|
|
|-
|8
|Suresh Singh
|
|CDM
|
|2019
|2024
|
|
|-
|10
|Javi Hernández
|
|CAM
|
|2022
|2024
|
|
|-
|12
|Danish Farooq Bhat
|
|LM
|
|2021
|2023
|
|
|-
|18
|Rohit Kumar
|
|CDM
|
|2021
|2023
|
|
|-
|25
|Namgyal Bhutia
|
|RM
|
|2020
|2026
|
|
|-
|28
|Amay Morajkar
|
|CDM
|
|2020
|2024
|
|
|-
|31
|Leon Augustine
|
|RW/RM
|
|2019
|2025
|
|
|-
|35
|Biswa Darjee
|
|LM
|
|2020
|2024
|
|
|-
|36
|Thoi Singh
|
|MF
|
|
|
|
|
|-
|40
|Damaitphang Lyngdoh
|
|CAM
|
|2021
|2024
|
|
|-
|42
|Akashdeep Singh
|
|MF
|
|2021
|2024
|
|
|-
! colspan="9" style="background:#2545A0; color:#FFFFFF; ; text-align:center;"|Forwards
|-
|9
|Prince Ibara
|
|CF
|
|2021
|2023
|
|
|-
|11
|Sunil Chhetri
|
|CF
|
|2013
|2023
|
|
|-
|14
|Harmanpreet Singh
|
|CF
|
|2021
|2023
|
|
|-
|17
|Edmund Lalrindika
|
|CF
|
|2019
|2022
|
|
|-
|21
|Udanta Singh
|
|RW
|
|2014
|2023
|
|
|-
|22
|Roy Krishna
|
|CF
|
|2022
|2023
|
|
|-
|23
|Faisal Ali
|
|RW
|
|2022
|2025
|
|
|-
|24
|Sudheer Kotikela
|
|FW
| 20 August
|2022
|2024
|
|
|-
|26
|Bidyashagar Singh †
|
|FW
|
|2021
|2024
|
|
|-
|38
|Sivasakthi Narayanan
|
|CF
|
|2021
|2022
|
|
|-
|−
|Ankith Padmanabhan
|
|FW
| 
|2022
|2025
|
|

† 
Loaned out.

Injury record

Pre-season
Bengaluru FC kicked off their pre-season training on 25 July 2022 with Simon Grayson leading the available squad in Ballari. Sunil Chhetri was part of the initial squad and made his record 10th pre-season appearance for the club. Midfielder Amay Morajkar, who had been out from the squad due to a long-term injury, also returned to the senior team in the training camp. On 27 July, the squad trained at Inspire Institute of Sport, a high-performance training center in Vijaynagar. New foreign signings Javi Hernández and Roy Krishna joined the training camp three days later.

On 14 August, faithful of Bengaluru FC reunited with the team for the first time in three years as the club hosted its traditional open pre-season training sessions at Bangalore Football Stadium (BFS), which is an event attended by the fans every season, to watch the club kickoff its new season. This season's event also featured the sale of free digital tickets for the first time. The last time when such an event was hosted at BFS was back in 2019 for the 2019–20 season. During the player announcement at the event, the club took off fans for a surprise after Sandesh Jhingan was announced as their new signing out of the blue. The Indian international had previously donned Bengaluru's jersey in the 2016-17 season.

Competitions

Overview

Indian Super League 

The league returned to its traditional home-away format after spending two seasons at a centralized venue in Goa during the pandemic. In August, the athletes raised concerns about the damage to the athletic track in Sree Kanteerava Stadium due to pitch maintenance work. In response to this, the Department of Youth Empowerment and Sports (DYES), Government of Karnataka, had stated that it was regular upkeep work and the stadium could be let out for football purposes as per 'official procedures.' The league kicked off in October, and a total of six instead of four top-placed teams qualified for the playoffs.

Summary

League table

Result summary

Results by round

League stage 
The fixtures for the 2022-23 season of ISL were announced on 1 September. Bengaluru FC faced NorthEast United on 8 October.

Playoffs

Semifinals

Durand Cup

Bengaluru FC had never won the Durand Cup and made their fourth appearance in the 131st edition of the tournament. They were clubbed in Group A with the defending champions FC Goa, two-time champions Mohammedan SC, Jamshedpur FC and one-time runners-up Indian Air Force, which is one of the four traditional armed forces' teams. Sunil Chhetri was reportedly set to play in Durand Cup after a gap of nine years. 

On 15 August, Bengaluru announced a 25-man squad of primary players for the tournament which confirmed Chhetri's participation.

Group A

The squad touched down in Kolkata on 15 August and started their preparations on the same day for the first group stage game against Jamshedpur two days later. Bengaluru were facing the reserve side of Jamshedpur lead by youth team coach Indranil Chakraborty. Sunil Chhetri opened the scoring for the dominant Bengaluru in the 23rd minute before debutant Roy Krishna doubled the lead in the 56th minute, helping Bengaluru kick-off their missing silverware quest with a 2-1 win, despite Rishi's consolation goal for Jamshedpur.

In the second game, Bengaluru faced Indian Air Force on 23 August where they breezed past the armed force side after scoring four goals in response to none. Roy Krishna and Sunil Chhetri found themselves on the scoresheet yet again in the first half while the substitutes Faisal Ali and Sivasakthi Narayanan added two more to the tally in the latter half. Bengaluru moved jointly to the top of the table along with Mohammedan. After the game, Bengaluru alleged racial abuse on one of their player from one of the opposition's player and raised the issue to the relevant authorities.

With two wins in two games, Bengaluru FC then faced the defending champions FC Goa who were fielding a reserve side this time around. Bengaluru yet again took an early 2-0 lead via back-to-back goals from Sunil Chhetri and Sivasakthi but failed to hold the lead after the Goan side with the likes of Phrangki Buam and Princeton Rebello who managed to equalise the score. Despite a draw, it ensured Bengaluru's qualification to the knock-out stage, with a game left to be played against hosts Mohammedan.

Bengaluru's final group stage encounter was against hosts Mohammedan SC. With both the teams already making cut into the knock-out stage, the match determined who tops the table in Group A and by virtue of which, will face an easier side from Group D in the quarter-finals. Simon Grayson made nine changes in the playing eleven from their previous game against Goa. A wonderful team combination play saw Mohammedan get an early lead in the 13th minute after Ningthoujam Pritam Singh tapped in the rebounded save from the Bengaluru's custodian Lara Sharma. The game turned into Bengaluru's way after Mohammedan's Abhishek Halder was sent off and his team was down to 10-men on the pitch. Bengaluru kept knokcing on the doors and finally broke it thanks to the Sivasakthi's shot which struck the crossbar and fell inwards before bouncing out. The game ended at stalemate and Mohammedan topped the group while Bengaluru's quarter-final clash was set up against Odisha FC.

Knockout stage

After finishing second in the group stage, Bengaluru faced the toppers of Group D, Odisha in the third quarter-final. Both the sides did not lose a single game until this round, and as a matter of a fact, Odisha had won all their games in the group stage without conceding a single goal while scoring twelve. Naorem Roshan Singh who had returned to the squad from an illness was started by Simon Grayson for the first time in the tournament. After a close encounter in the first half, both the teams failed to disturb the scoresheet and it was much of the same in the second half. With only ten minutes left in the game, Shubham Sarangi went into the booking for the second time and was sent off, thus reducing Odisha to 10-men on the field. Bengaluru tried to take advantage of the situation, but were unable to score and hence pushed the game into extra-time.

Seven minutes into extra-time and one minute after being substituted, Sivasakthi gave Bengaluru the lead after turning the ball in which was rebounded off former Bengaluru FC's goalkeeper, Ralte's save. Despite having a numerical disadvantage, Odisha managed to pull off an equaliser as Diego Maurício headed home a free-kick in to the net in the 115th minute. When the game seemed to be heading towards a penalty shootout to break the tie, Ralte gave the ball away cheaply in the form of a throw in during the added time in the second half of the extra time, which was then picked up by Bengaluru and an attack was initiated with Faisal Ali playing it to Roy Krishna who then scored a 25-yard stunner to take Bengaluru FC into their third semi-final.

Semi-final was a barrier that Bengaluru had never been able to cross previously in two different attempts. In their third attempt, Bengaluru met Hyderabad FC in the second semi-final at the Vivekananda Yuba Bharati Krirangan. Hyderabad had topped Group C with three wins in four and had beaten Rajasthan United 3-1 in the fourth quarter-final on their way to maiden semi-final appearance. An evenly poised encounter saw Bengaluru score the opener at the half-hour mark via an own goal from Hyderabad's Odei Onaindia. Jayesh Rane, who had replaced Javi Hernandez from the previous game, played out wide to Prabir Das who put an inch perfect delivery near the goal mouth towards on rushing Roy Krishna, which was then deflected in to the net by Hyderabad's defender.

In the second half, Hyderabad threw everything at the goal, made several attacking moves and earned several set pieces but to no avail as Bengaluru's backline came on top with the likes of trio: Sandesh Jhingan, Aleksander Jovanovic and Parag Shrivas. Bengaluru were in to the finals of the Durand Cup for the first time in their history, and their first final appearance in any tournament since the 2018-19 season's final of Indian Super League. Bengaluru also became the only Indian club to play final of every major club competition in the country.

Final

It was Bengaluru's maiden Durand Cup final appearance and their first cup final since the 2018 Super Cup. They were up against Mumbai City, who were also playing their maiden Durand Cup final. Mumbai City had topped Group B with two wins, a draw and a defeat at the hands of East Bengal. En route to the final, they had beaten Chennaiyin FC in the quarter-final in an eight goal thriller which was settled in the extra-time by Greg Stewart's 118th-minute winner, while in the semi-final, Mumbai overcame Mohammedan's challenge thanks to a 90th-minute winner by Bipin Singh.

After the traditional pre-match formalities in the Durand Cup final by the Indian Army, the matched kick-off with Bengaluru starting the game brightly of the two teams. It took only eleven minutes for the first time starter Sivasakthi, also the top scorer for Bengaluru in the tournament to take his side into an early lead. Aleksander Jovanovic's long ball directed at Sivasakthi, who beat the defense of Senegalese Mourtada Fall to successfully chip past the hapless Phurba Lachenpa in goal. Mumbai had their fair share of chances and they managed to convert one of those. It was exactly at the half hour mark when Mumbai pulled things to a level from a quickly taken free-kick as Apuia tapped the ball in off a rebounded shot that Gurpreet parried away. Both the sides went in to the half-time break with everything to play for in the latter half.

After the resumption, Bengaluru continued to attack and take their lead back and came close during the 60th minute when Jayesh's deftly lobbed ball in towards Chhetri saw Lachenpa saving the shot. A minute later, Bengaluru did find their lead as Chhetri's corner found the header of Alan Costa to make it 2-1 for Bengaluru in the 56th minute. Mumbai then initiated several attacks on Bengaluru's defense but one of those attacks was converted into a counter attack by Bengaluru, who almost put the game to bed had Lachenpa not made a wonderful save of Chhetri's shot. Mumbai almost equalised when Greg Stewart's long ranger shot rolled past few inches away from the goalpost. A final free-kick attempt by Mumbai was shot wide and the final whistle was blown, Bengaluru had grabbed their seventh trophy in the form of maiden Durand Cup silverware.

Super Cup

Super Cup returned to the Indian football calendar after it was suspended following the 2019 edition. Bengaluru FC, the inaugural edition's champions, will be participating in the 20-team tournament of eleven teams featuring from ISL and nine from I-League.

Group A

Accolades
Bengaluru's captain, Sunil Chhetri, won the AIFF men's player of the year award for the record seventh time. He was nominated by the Indian national team's head coach Igor Stimac.

Personnel

The German coach Marco Pezzaiuoli, who was previously appointed on a performance-based three-year contract in 2021, was released on 8 June 2021. On the same day, Bengaluru FC appointed the English manager Simon Grayson as their new head coach on a two-year deal. On 29 July, Englishmen Eric Kinder and Andy Beasley were appointed as the assistant and goalkeeping coaches, respectively.

Statistics

Appearances and goals

|-
! colspan=12 style="background:#2545A0; color:#FFFFFF; ; text-align:center| Goalkeepers

|-
! colspan=12 style="background:#2545A0; color:#FFFFFF; ; text-align:center| Defenders
|-

|-
! colspan=12 style="background:#2545A0; color:#FFFFFF; ; text-align:center| Midfielders
|-

|-
! colspan=12 style="background:#2545A0; color:#FFFFFF; ; text-align:center| Forwards
|-

|-

Updated: 18 September 2022

Goal scorers

Updated: 18 September 2022

Clean sheets

Updated: 15 September 2022

Assists

Updated: 18 September 2022

Disciplinary record

Disciplinary points (yellow card = 1 point, red card as a result of two yellow cards = 3 points, direct red card = 3 points, yellow card followed by direct red card = 4 points);
Updated: 18 September 2022

See also
 List of Bengaluru FC seasons

References

Bengaluru FC seasons
2020s in Bangalore
Bengaluru